Tito Buss (1 September 1925 – 30 April 2013) was the Catholic bishop of the Diocese of Rio do Sul, Brazil.

Tito Buss was born in São Ludgero, Brazil. Ordained to the priesthood in December 8, 1951, he was named bishop in 1969 and retired in 2000.

Notes

1925 births
2013 deaths
People from Santa Catarina (state)
20th-century Roman Catholic bishops in Brazil
Roman Catholic bishops of Rio do Sul